Mr Gay may refer to:

Events
International Mr Gay Competition
Mr Gay Europe
Mr Gay World
country specific
Mister Gay Chile
Mr Gay India
Mr Gay Ireland
Mr Gay South Africa
Mr Gay Sweden
Mr Gay Wales
Mr Gay UK

Others
Mr. Gay Canada, a Canadian English language documentary television series on OUTtv

See also
Miss Gay (disambiguation)